State Highway 32 (RJ SH 32, SH-32) is a State Highway in Rajasthan state of India that connects Chawa in Pali district of Rajasthan with Ganoda in Banswara district of Rajasthan. The total length of RJ SH 32 is 219 km. 

This highway connects RJ SH 16 in Sadri to RJ SH 10 in Banswara. It also connects National Highway 76 in Gogunda to National Highway 8 Udaipur and then to National Highway 113 in Banswara. It is crossing different state highways on the way to Banswara RJ SH 62 in Sadri, RJ SH 50 in Udaipur, RJ SH 53 in Salumbar and RJ SH 54 in Aspur. Other cities and towns on this highway are: Ranakpur, Gogunda, Udaipur, Jaisamand, Kherad, Salumbar, Aspur, Sabala, Lohariya and Ganoda.

See also
 List of State Highways in Rajasthan
 Roads in Pali district

References
 State Highway

Pali district
Transport in Udaipur district
Dungarpur district
Banswara district
State Highways in Rajasthan